Snow Water Lake is a lake in the U.S. state of Nevada.

When it's not completely dry, Snow Water Lake is filled by melting snow, hence the name.

References

Lakes of Elko County, Nevada